The 2017 Vietnam Open Grand Prix, officially Yonex Sunrise Vietnam Open 2017 was a badminton tournament which took place at the Nguyen Du Stadium in Ho Chi Minh City, Vietnam on 4–10 September 2017 and had a total purse of $65,000.

Tournament
The 2017 Vietnam Open Grand Prix was the thirteenth Grand Prix's badminton tournament of the 2017 BWF Grand Prix Gold and Grand Prix and also part of the Vietnam Open championships which have been held since 1996. This tournament was organized by the Vietnam Badminton Federation, and presented by the Hochiminh City Badminton Association, with the sanctioned from the Badminton World Federation.

Venue
This international tournament was held at the Nguyen Du Cultural Sports Club in District 1, Ho Chi Minh City, Vietnam, and the practice venue at the Phu Tho Training Center in District 11.

Point distribution
Below is the tables with the point distribution for each phase of the tournament based on the BWF points system for the Grand Prix event.

Prize money
The total prize money was US$65,000. Distribution of prize money was in accordance with BWF regulations.

Men's singles

Seeds

 Hsu Jen-hao (third round)
 Sourabh Verma (withdrew)
 Khosit Phetpradab (champion)
 Zulfadli Zulkiffli (first round)
 Chong Wei Feng (third round)
 Lin Yu-hsien (second round)
 Ihsan Maulana Mustofa (second round)
 Daren Liew (quarterfinals)
 Nguyen Tien Minh (third round)
 Suppanyu Avihingsanon (final)
 Hsueh Hsuan-yi (first round)
 Pannawit Thongnuam (first round)
 Goh Giap Chin (semifinals)
 Yu Igarashi (third round)
 Abhishek Yelegar (second round)
 Panji Ahmad Maulana (third round)

Finals

Top half

Section 1

Section 2

Section 3

Section 4

Bottom half

Section 5

Section 6

Section 7

Section 8

Women's singles

Seeds

 Sayaka Takahashi (champion)
 Hanna Ramadini (semifinals)
 Dinar Dyah Ayustine (semifinals)
 Vu Thi Trang (final)
 Lee Ying Ying (first round)
 Chen Su-yu (quarterfinals)
 Pai Yu-po (quarterfinals)
 Sung Shuo-yun (second round)

Finals

Top half

Section 1

Section 2

Bottom half

Section 3

Section 4

Men's doubles

Seeds

 Chooi Kah Ming / Low Juan Shen (second round)
 Mohammad Ahsan / Rian Agung Saputro (withdrew)
 Liao Min-chun / Su Cheng-heng (final)
 Goh Sze Fei / Nur Izzuddin (withdrew)
 Arjun M.R. / Ramchandran Shlok (semifinals)
 Hendra Aprida Gunawan / Markis Kido (second round)
 Wahyu Nayaka / Ade Yusuf (champion)
 Do Tuan Duc / Pham Hong Nam (second round)

Finals

Top half

Section 1

Section 2

Bottom half

Section 3

Section 4

Women's doubles

Seeds

 Chow Mei Kuan / Lee Meng Yean (semifinals)
 Chiang Kai-Hsin / Hung Shih-han (first round)
 Lin Xiao-min / Wu Fang-chien (first round)
 Chisato Hoshi / Naru Shinoya (quarterfinals)
 Chayanit Chaladchalam / Phataimas Muenwong (champion)
 Misato Aratama / Akane Watanabe (quarterfinals)
 Della Destiara Haris / Rizki Amelia Pradipta (final)
 Anggia Shitta Awanda / Yulfira Barkah (semifinals)

Finals

Top half

Section 1

Section 2

Bottom half

Section 3

Section 4

Mixed doubles

Seeds

 Tseng Min-hao / Hu Ling-fang (quarterfinals)
 Chang Ko-chi / Chang Hsin-tien (second round)
 Yogendran Khrishnan /  Prajakta Sawant (first round)
 Liao Min-chun / Chen Hsiao-huan (quarterfinals)
 Chan Peng Soon / Cheah Yee See (semifinals)
 Alfian Eko Prasetya / Melati Daeva Oktavianti (champion)
 Yantoni Edy Saputra / Marsheilla Gischa Islami (first round)
 Ronald Alexander / Annisa Saufika (semifinals)

Finals

Top half

Section 1

Section 2

Bottom half

Section 3

Section 4

References

External links 
 Tournament Link

Vietnam Open (badminton)
BWF Grand Prix Gold and Grand Prix
2017 in Vietnamese sport
Vietnam Open Grand Prix